Acmonital ( or Italian monetary steel) is a stainless steel alloy consisting mostly of iron, with 0.14% carbon, 17.5-19% chromium, 0.50% magnesium, 1.15% silicium, 0.03% sulfur, and 0.03% phosphorus by weight. Acmonital was used for the Italian Lira coins.

References

Steel alloys
Coinage metals and alloys